Hugh Malcolm Fletcher (born 8 April 1933 died January 2023) was a Scottish former professional footballer who played for Carlisle United in the Football League.

Fletcher was born in Lochgilphead, Argyll, and began his football career with his local club, Lochgilphead F.C. He signed for Celtic, but never played for the first team, and moved south of the border to join Third Division North club Carlisle United ahead of the 1956–57 season. Although primarily a full back, Fletcher was sometimes used in a more forward position, and in his third season with Carlisle, he finished as the club's top scorer, with 19 goals in all competitions, 17 in the league. He remained with Carlisle until the 1961–62 season, finishing with 18 goals from 124 league appearances.

References

1933 births
Living people
People from Lochgilphead
Scottish footballers
Association football defenders
Celtic F.C. players
Carlisle United F.C. players
English Football League players
Sportspeople from Argyll and Bute